Probable G-protein coupled receptor 85 is a protein that in humans is encoded by the GPR85 gene.

See also
SREB

References

Further reading

G protein-coupled receptors